Publius Cornelius Cossus was a consular tribune in 408 BC of the Roman Republic.

Cornelius belonged to the Cornelia gens, one of the older patrician gens of the Republic. Cornelius father was the Roman hero Aulus Cornelius Cossus who had slewn the King of the Veii, Lars Tolumnius, in single combat. Cornelius had two known brothers, Aulus Cornelius Cossus, consul in 413 BC and Gnaeus Cornelius Cossus, consul in 409 BC. Following filiations it would seem that Gnaeus Cornelius Cossus, consular tribune in 406, and Publius Cornelius Cossus, consular tribune in 395 BC, were the sons of Cornelius or his namesake, Publius Cornelius Cossus, consular tribune in 415 BC.

Career 
Cornelius held the imperium in 408 BC as one of three consular tribunes. His colleagues in the office were Gaius Julius Iulus and Gaius Servilius Ahala. The college contained no member who was a previous consular and was uniquely inexperienced in this regard. The college seems to have been plagued by internal strife and Cornelius colleague Servilius moved against his colleagues and appointed a dictator, Publius Cornelius Rutilus Cossus.

While Cornelius two colleagues would continue to flourish within the political scene with both being re-elected as consular tribunes in 407 and 405 BC respectively while Servilius would even reach the tribuneship for a third term in 402 BC.

See also

References 

5th-century BC Romans
Roman Republic
Roman consular tribunes
Cornelii
408 BC